Le Grand Continent is a journal founded in Paris in 2019, devoted to geopolitics, European, legal, intellectual, and artistic issues, with the aim to "build a strategic, political and intellectual debate on a relevant scale."

Background and activity

Le Grand Continent has been published sunce April 2019 by Groupe d'Etudes Géopolitiques, a think tank founded in 2017 by three students of École normale supérieure in Paris, Gilles Gressani, Mathéo Malik and Pierre Ramond.

The journal's articles are written by young researchers, academics, but also political decision-makers, experts and artists including Pamela Anderson, Laurence Boone, Mireille Delmas-Marty, Carlo Ginzburg, Louise Glück, Henry Kissinger, Pascal Lamy, Toni Negri, Thomas Piketty, Elisabeth Roudinesco, Olga Tokarczuk, and Mario Vargas Llosa.

Le Grand Continent also organizes a weekly cycle of debates at the École normale supérieure in Paris, as well as a cycle of conferences. A number of these have been published as a book titled Une certaine idée de l'Europe, published by Flammarion in 2019.

Since the beginning of the COVID-19 pandemic in Europe in March 2020, Le Grand Continent has published a "Covid-19 Geopolitical Observatory" with analytical articles on the pandemic's development and implications, as well as regularly updated geographical data visualizations presenting the spread of the pandemic throughout Europe, which have been widely cited in media.

Notes

External link
 

2019 establishments in France
French-language magazines
Literary magazines published in France
Magazines established in 2019
Political magazines published in France
Magazines published in Paris